Andrei Răzvan Paliu (born 11 July 2000) is a Romanian professional footballer who plays as a defender for CSO Filiași. He made his debut in Liga I on 26 May 2019, in a match between Concordia and Politehnica Iași, ended with the score of 4-1.

References

External links
 
 Andrei Paliu at lpf.ro

2000 births
Living people
Romanian footballers
Association football defenders
Liga I players
Liga II players
Liga III players
CS Concordia Chiajna players
AFC Dacia Unirea Brăila players
FC Astra Giurgiu players